The Yakushev-Borzov YakB-12.7 mm is a remotely controlled 12.7×108mm caliber four-barrel rotary cannon developed by the Soviet Union in 1973 for the Mil Mi-24 attack gunship and low-capacity troop transporter, with 1470 rounds, which can also be mounted in GUV-8700 machine-gun pods with 750 rounds. It has a high rate of fire (4–5,000 rounds per minute) and is also one of the few self-powered guns of the Gatling type (i.e. it is gas-operated, rather than requiring an external motor to operate).

On the Mi-24 it is mounted in the VSPU-24 undernose turret, with an azimuth of 60° to either side, an elevation of 20°, and a depression of 60°. The gun is slaved to the KPS-53AV undernose sighting system with a reflector sight in the front cockpit.

It was replaced by the fixed, side-mounted GSh-30K or the swivel-mounted GSh-23L in the late mark of the Mi-24 helicopters, as it did not provide enough firepower against dug-in or lightly armored targets that did not necessitate a rocket attack but it is still used on Mil Mi-24, Mil Mi-36, and Mil Mi-40 helicopters.

Users

Former users

See also
 GAU-19, a Western 12.7 mm powered Gatling gun
 List of Russian weaponry
 List of multiple-barrel firearms

References

External links
 KBP machine guns Yak-B
 Enemy Forces Mi-24

Machine guns of Russia
Machine guns of the Soviet Union
Aircraft guns of the Soviet Union
Multi-barrel machine guns
12.7×108 mm machine guns
KBP Instrument Design Bureau products
Military equipment introduced in the 1970s